Kaufusi is a surname. Notable people with the surname include:

Antonio Kaufusi (born 1984), Tongan rugby league footballer
Bronson Kaufusi (born 1991), American football defensive end
Corbin Kaufusi (born 1993), American football defensive end
Felise Kaufusi (born 1992), New Zealand rugby league footballer
Jason Kaufusi (born 1979), American football player
Malupo Kaufusi (born 1979), Tongan rugby league footballer 
Michelle Kaufusi, American politician
Oregon Kaufusi, New Zealand rugby league footballer 
Patrick Kaufusi (born 1994), Tongan rugby league footballer 
Steve Kaufusi (born 1963), American football defensive lineman 

Tongan-language surnames